Rickettsia honei is a species of Rickettsia.

It can cause Flinders Island spotted fever.

References 

Rickettsiaceae
Pathogenic bacteria